Mountmellick embroidery or Mountmellick work is a floral whitework embroidery originating in the town of Mountmellick in County Laois, Ireland, in the early nineteenth century.

History
It was developed around 1825 by Johanna Carter, who taught it to a group of about 15 women and girls. It used white cotton thread on white cotton fabric, and predominantly floral motifs. The plants featured were those that were found around the town of Mountmellick, and included blackberries, oak, fern, dog roses and shamrocks.

The Great Irish Famine (1845-1849) hit the town of Mountmellick very hard. In about 1880, Mrs Millner, a member of the Religious Society of Friends (who were a strong part of the Mountmellick community) started an industrial association to help people within the town. She employed women to stitch Mountmellick embroidery for sale. Many of these items were sold from the port of Cobh, from where many people embarked on journeys to America.

In the 1970s, Sister Teresa Margaret McCarthy of the Presentation Convent in Mountmellick learned of the embroidery, and collected together examples from around the area in order to study and learn from them. She taught herself the stitches and then began teaching others. Yvette Stanton has recreated the original knitted fringe used in historical pieces of Mountmellick embroidery.

As of 2022, the chairperson of the Mountmellick embroidery museum is Ann Dowling.

Technique and uses
Mountmellick embroidery uses predominantly knotted and padded stitches to create beautifully textured whitework embroidery. The work features a characteristic knitted fringe. Other forms of lace, such as crochet or bobbin lace are not authentic trims for Mountmellick work.

The embroidery was usually employed on items of household use such as doilies, nightdress cases, brush and comb bags, bedspreads/coverlets, and tablecloths. Though the work was white and hence inclined to show stains, it was so sturdy that it could be easily boiled white again.

Today, Mountmellick embroidery is enjoying a resurgence of popularity around the world. A museum at the Mountmellick Development Association in Mountmellick has been opened to permanently display articles of Mountmellick embroidery for all to see. The National Museum of Ireland (Dublin) also has some beautiful examples of the work, as does the Ulster Folk and Transport Museum outside Belfast and the An Grianan Adult Education College at Termonfechin, County Louth.

References 

Traditional Mountmellick embroidery (white-on-white work only)
"Mountmellick Embroidery: Inspired by Nature" by Yvette Stanton and Prue Scott, Vetty Creations, 2007 (2nd ed.). 
"Mountmellick Work: Irish White Embroidery" by Jane Houston Almqvist, Colin Smythe, 1990. 
"Traditional Irish Embroidery: Mountmellick Work" by Sandra Counahan. Mercier Press, Ireland. 
"Beginner's Guide to Mountmellick Embroidery", by Pat Trott. Search Press, UK. 
"Mountmellick embroidery", by Jules and Kaethe Kliot. Lacis Publications, 1998. 

Non-traditional interpretations
"Mountmellick from My Muse" by Janet M. Davies. JMD Designs. New Zealand.

Further reading 
Beale, Edgar, The earth between them, Wentworth Books, Sydney, 1975
Boyle, Elizabeth, The Irish flowerers, Ulster Folk Museum and Institute of Irish Studies, Queens University, Belfast, 1971
O'Keeffe, Regina, The Quakers of Mountmellick, FAS and the Mountmellick Development Association, Mountmellick, 1974

External links 
Mountmellick Development Craft Museum. History of Mountmellick work
Vetty Creations Links to Mountmellick embroidery information, collections, websites, books, Mountmellick kits and embroidery supplies. 
www.jmddesigns.co.nz/ Books, tutorials and designs of  Mountmellick embroidery, with pictures.
 Video tutorial Mountmellick stitch
Mountmellick Embroidery, TRC, Leiden The Textile Research Centre of Leiden’s page on Mountmellick work and its history.

Embroidery
County Laois
Textile arts of Ireland